Edmund Morison Wimperis (6 February 1835, in Flocker's Brook, Chester – 25 December 1900, in Southbourne, Christchurch, Hampshire), was a British wood-engraver and watercolourist  and member of the Arts Club.

Life

He was the eldest son of Mary and Edmund Richard Wimperis. Edmund was a cashier of Messrs. Walker, Parker, & Co.'s lead works at Chester. 
Artistically, the members of this family were unusually talented and were all raised in Chester. They were close friends of Charles Kingsley, the author of Water Babies, who at that time was a canon of Chester Cathedral. Edmund's children were members of the Naturalists Field Club, with Kingsley as the leader. They were also connected by marriage to the Brontës through a Maria Branwell, the mother of the famous sisters.

About 1851, Edmund was apprenticed to the wood-engraver Mason Jackson, for seven years, and also trained under the watercolourist Myles Birket Foster. 
From about 1863, he worked for the publisher Joseph Cundall and for the Illustrated London News. Later in his life, he started to paint and sketch with Thomas Collier.

When aged about 38 he became a professional landscape watercolourist and member of the Society of British Artists. 
In 1874, he joined the Royal Institute of Painters in Water Colours, and went on to become one of its foremost members, being elected vice-president in 1895. 
In 1879–80, he accompanied his two sisters Fanny and Jenny on a visit to their sister, Susanna, married and living in Dunedin in New Zealand. 
He stayed for some months, exhibiting at the Otago Art Society in 1880.

He died at Southbourne, Christchurch, Hampshire, on 25 December 1900.

Family
On 11 April 1863 he married Anne Harry Edmonds (b. c. 1841 Penzance), daughter of Walter Edmonds of Penzance, whose mother was a cousin of Maria Branwell, and Ann Courtenay Harry of Helston, and raised a family of two sons and two daughters, all of whom were talented artists.

Edmund's siblings were:
Eleanor Wimperis (b.1836)
John James Wimperis (b.1839)
Frances Mary Wimperis, known as Fanny (1840–1925), painter and art teacher in Dunedin, New Zealand
Susanna White Wimperis (1842–1915), botanical artist in Dunedin, New Zealand
Ann Jane Wimperis, known as Jenny (1844–1929), painter in Dunedin, New Zealand
Joseph Price Wimperis (1849–1877)
Harriet Elizabeth Wimperis (1851–1869) 

Edmund's children were:
 Edmund Walter Wimperis (1865–1946), architect and partner in Wimperis Simpson & Guthrie
Arthur Harold Wimperis (1874–1953),  illustrator, playwright, lyricist and Academy Award-winning screenwriter
Ann H Wimperis 
Ethel M Wimperis

References

Attribution

1835 births
1900 deaths
19th-century English painters
English male painters
English watercolourists
English engravers
Landscape artists
People from Chester
19th-century English male artists